Tommy Romero (born July 8, 1997) is an American professional baseball pitcher in the Washington Nationals organization. He made his MLB debut in 2022 with the Tampa Bay Rays.

Amateur career
Romero graduated from Coral Springs Charter School in 2015. Unselected in the 2015 Major League Baseball draft, he enrolled at Polk State College where he played baseball. After his freshman year in 2016, he transferred to Eastern Florida State College. As a sophomore in 2017, he won nine games, compiled a 1.13 ERA, and led the NJCAA in strikeouts with 136.

Professional career

Seattle Mariners organization
After his sophomore season, Romero was drafted by the Seattle Mariners in the 15th round of the 2017 Major League Baseball draft. Romero signed and made his professional debut with the Rookie-level Arizona League Mariners, going 5-1 with a 2.08 ERA in  innings pitched. He began 2018 with the Clinton LumberKings of the Class A Midwest League.

Tampa Bay Rays
On May 25, 2018, the Mariners traded Romero and Andrew Moore to the Tampa Bay Rays in exchange for Denard Span and Álex Colomé. He was assigned to the Bowling Green Hot Rods of the Class A Midwest League, with whom he was named an All-Star. In 25 total starts between Clinton and Bowling Green, he went 11-4 with a 2.95 ERA and a 1.27 WHIP. He spent a majority of the 2019 season with the Charlotte Stone Crabs of the Class A-Advanced Florida State League, pitching to a 12-4 record with a 1.89 ERA over 23 games (18 starts), striking out 103 over  innings. He made one spot start for the Montgomery Biscuits of the Class AA Southern League at the end of the season. He did not play a minor league game in 2020 since the season was cancelled due to the COVID-19 pandemic. That winter, he played for Criollos de Caguas of the Liga de Béisbol Profesional Roberto Clemente (LBPRC). He also played for Puerto Rico in the 2021 Caribbean Series.

To begin the 2021 season, Romero was assigned back to Montgomery, now members of the Double-A South. After pitching to a 1-0 record with a 1.88 ERA and 75 strikeouts over 48 innings, he was promoted to the Durham Bulls of the Triple-A East in July. He earned Triple-A East Pitcher of the Month honors for September after going 5-0 with a 0.31 ERA over five starts. Over 12 total starts with Durham, Romero went 7-2 with a 3.18 ERA and seventy strikeouts over  innings.

On November 19, 2021, the Rays selected Romero's contract and added him to the 40-man roster. He returned to Durham to begin the 2022 season. After his first start, the Rays promoted Romero to the major leagues on April 12 and he made his MLB debut that night as the starting pitcher versus the Oakland Athletics at Tropicana Field. Coincidentally, the starting pitcher for the Athletics was Adam Oller, who was also making his MLB debut in the game. He pitched  innings, giving up three earned runs on five walks, two hits, one home run, and one strikeout. He was designated for assignment on August 23, 2022.

Washington Nationals
Romero was claimed off waivers by the Washington Nationals on August 25, 2022. He was immediately optioned to the Nationals' Triple-A affiliate, the Rochester Red Wings. On November 15, Romero was designated for assignment. He re-signed a minor league deal on December 14, 2022.

References

External links

1997 births
Living people
Arizona League Mariners players
Baseball players from Fort Lauderdale, Florida
Bowling Green Hot Rods players
Charlotte Stone Crabs players
Clinton LumberKings players
Criollos de Caguas players
Durham Bulls players
Liga de Béisbol Profesional Roberto Clemente pitchers
Major League Baseball pitchers
Montgomery Biscuits players
Tampa Bay Rays players
Washington Nationals players